Thorndale is a census-designated place in Chester County, Pennsylvania, United States. The population was 3,407 at the 2010 census. Thorndale is the commercial and administrative center of Caln Township.  The community's main street is U.S. Route 30 Business. Many of Thorndale's old houses fell into disrepair from the late 1990s to present and have been torn down and replaced with new businesses. Thorndale is historically notable for containing a summer house of US President James Buchanan, which still stands and has been incorporated into a golf course and turned into a restaurant. The community contains the Thorndale Fire Station and Caln Elementary School, part of the Coatesville Area School District.  Thorndale sits along SEPTA's Paoli/Thorndale Line and is currently the last station stop on that line.  It is also served by the SEPTA Route 135 bus.

Geography
Thorndale is located at  (39.996456, -75.751606).

It is part of Caln Township, with students attending school in either the Coatesville Area School District or the Downingtown Area School District.

Demographics
As of the census of 2000, there were 3,561 people, 1,347 households, and 952 families residing in the CDP. The population density was 1,953.2 people per square mile (755.4/km). There were 1,418 housing units at an average density of 777.8/sq mi (300.8/km). The racial makeup of the CDP was 82.65% White, 10.98% African American, 0.22% Native American, 2.33% Asian, 0.11% Pacific Islander, 2.13% from other races, and 1.57% from two or more races. Hispanic or Latino of any race were 4.32% of the population.

There were 1,347 households, out of which 36.8% had children under the age of 18 living with them, 57.2% were married couples living together, 9.3% had a female householder with no husband present, and 29.3% were non-families. 22.3% of all households were made up of individuals, and 5.4% had someone living alone who was 65 years of age or older. The average household size was 2.63 and the average family size was 3.12.

In the CDP, the population was spread out, with 26.1% under the age of 18, 7.9% from 18 to 24, 36.1% from 25 to 44, 21.1% from 45 to 64, and 8.7% who were 65 years of age or older. The median age was 35 years. For every 100 females, there were 94.8 males. For every 100 females age 18 and over, there were 95.2 males.

The median income for a household in the CDP was $61,830, and the median income for a family was $70,781. Males had a median income of $45,573 versus $35,096 for females. The per capita income for the CDP was $25,376. About 4.4% of families and 6.4% of the population were below the poverty line, including 9.9% of those under age 18 and 14.5% of those age 65 or over.

References

Census-designated places in Chester County, Pennsylvania
Census-designated places in Pennsylvania